Pajarita Wilderness is a protected wilderness area managed by the Coronado National Forest in the U.S. state of Arizona. Established in 1984 under the Arizona Wilderness Act, the array of canyons that make up the area sit at the western end of the Pajarito Mountains, and form a well-known migration route for birds. Sycamore Canyon is the centerpiece of the wilderness, a riparian forest that supports more than 160 bird species.

The Sycamore Canyon trail is a popular hiking destination very close to the international border between Mexico and the United States.

Current Wilderness Threats 
As of September 2020, construction of the U.S. government's border wall system and accompanying supply roads (and groundwater pumping) by contractors working for Customs and Border Protection are threatening the wilderness area. Scientists and environmentalists have voiced concerns about the border wall system's impact on ocelot, mountain lion, black bear, and jaguar wildlife corridors protected within the Pajarita Wilderness and nearby areas of Southern Arizona where the project is planned.

See also
 List of Arizona Wilderness Areas
 List of U.S. Wilderness Areas

References

External links
 Sycamore Canyon Trail – Coronado National Forest

IUCN Category Ib
Wilderness areas of Arizona
Coronado National Forest
Protected areas of Santa Cruz County, Arizona
Protected areas established in 1984
1984 establishments in Arizona